The International Literacy Foundation (ILF) is an independent, international nonprofit organisation, founded in 2010 with the aim of tackling illiteracy globally and therefore improving living standards around the world.

Overview 
The organisation has a mandate of alleviating illiteracy throughout the world. The core belief of the organisation and its affiliates is that literacy is the 'quintessential cornerstone of education', key to reducing poverty and therefore raising living standards around the world. It maintains a dedicated focus on individual causes, with the potential to make a positive impact on underprivileged groups and their quality of life.

The ILF seeks to meet these objectives through the administration of literacy-based projects, which is achieved through several methods:
 Conducting presentations and seminars
 The donation of educational material, such as books and computer technology
 Developing and expanding library facilities

Mission statement 
The mission of the ILF is based on its commitment to invest in initiatives encouraging and supporting literacy and education, with a primary focus on literacy, as well as making grants to other organisations supporting similar educational causes, including those in which members and volunteers are engaged.

As the organisation has its roots in education, however, it has a firm belief in the power of volunteers to collaborate, creating human opportunity and exerting a positive impact on the quality of life of those who are less fortunate.

Funding provided will therefore target selected initiatives and activities that promote education through literacy.

A Global Literacy Primer can also be found on the website, highlighting additional information

Individuals 
Further information can be found on the website.

Co-founders 
 Moaad Taufik - primarily responsible for the onsite co-ordination and execution of international literacy projects, as well as co-ordinating volunteers and support work.
 Oliver Muller - responsible for public relations and international fundraising, mainly in Europe and the Middle East
 Batool Taufik - responsible for public relations and international fundraising, mainly in the United Kingdom and Western Europe; also responsible for implementing knowledge in selection of materials used in construction of facilities to maintain economic efficiency, via engineering background

Directors 
 Dr. Abdulmagid Taufik - based in Liverpool, primarily responsible for establishing the strategic direction of the organisation as well as sourcing literacy-based projects worldwide, specifically in Europe.

Volunteers 
Below are a list of countries in which volunteers for the ILF are working:

  Bahrain
  Canada
  China
  Egypt
  Jordan
  Lebanon
  Nigeria
  Pakistan
  Turkey
  United Kingdom
  Scotland
  England
  United States of America
  United Arab Emirates
  Yemen
  Zambia
  Zimbabwe

Projects 

On the map above, completed projects are shaded in black while pipeline projects are shaded in green

 January, 2011  Toronto, Canada: debut project completed at the First Nations School of Toronto (FNST); workshops conducted and presentations held to support the Aboriginal community in North America. Over $2,500 raised, going towards the purchase of hundreds of books and other educational materials.
 February, 2011  Karachi, Pakistan: second project completed at the NGO sponsored Hope School in the Kurungi area of Karachi. Work carried out to convert an empty room at the school into a fully functional library (named the Bushra Khan Memorial Library, in commemoration of the highly regarded Pakistani/Canadian scholar Bushra Khan), providing over 600 books in numerous languages and two new computers with internet capabilities and a host of educational software.
 April, 2011  Nairobi, Kenya: third project completed at the By Grace Children's Home, a children's home for orphans, with 63 orphans aged 3–18; some were HIV positive. Situated in the Ngong district of the Kenyan capital Nairobi. Taufik visited, and converted an old room into a colourful library containing over 500 books and 2 PCs with access to the internet. The library was named the Salma Bishty Memorial Library, after a woman who actively encouraged literacy and the attainment of knowledge through literature.

Pipeline projects 
As well as the two projects already completed thus far (as of March 27, 2011), the organisation has already highlighted several new locations in its tireless efforts to tackle the serious problem of illiteracy; these include:
  Lusaka, Zambia
  Shanghai, China
  Cairo, Egypt
  Zawiya, Libya
  Mumbai, India

Corporate sponsors 
The ILF has collaborated with corporate sponsors, who help facilitate its international literacy projects. These organisations include the following, among others:
 Taufik Medicals Ltd

References

External links 
 ILF official website
 ILF on Facebook

Organizations promoting literacy
International educational charities
Community-building organizations